The New Zealand national football team has participated in 13 FIFA World Cup qualification campaigns between 1970 and 2018, qualifying for two FIFA World Cups; the 1982 FIFA World Cup in Spain and the 2010 World Cup in South Africa.

FIFA World Cup record

Record by opponent

Games against Soviet Union are included in statistics of Russia.

1982 FIFA World Cup

Group 6

2010 FIFA World Cup

Group F

Statistics

Goalscorers

Discipline

See also
New Zealand national football team
New Zealand national football team results
New Zealand at the FIFA Confederations Cup
New Zealand at the OFC Nations Cup

References

External links
New Zealand 1982 World Cup squad

 
New Zealand
World Cup